The Savannah Way is a route of highways and major roads across the tropical savannahs of northern Australia, linking Cairns in Queensland with Broome in Western Australia. Promoted as a self-drive tourist route, it joins Cairns, Normanton, Borroloola, Katherine, Kununurra, Fitzroy Crossing, Derby and Broome. It has been designated by the Queensland Government as a State Strategic Touring Route.Much of the route is Highway 1; however, much of it is on unsealed roads. Parts of Savannah Way form part of the National Highway network.

Alternate routes are signposted along the way allowing travellers different options from the main Savannah Way.  From Cairns they include travel via Chillagoe and the Burke Developmental Road to Karumba; via Einasleigh and Forsayth to Georgetown; via Gregory Downs to Boodjamulla National Park (Lawn Hill) and Bowthorn station; via Daly Waters  and Top Springs to Timber Creek; or via the Gibb River Road to Derby.

See also 

 Highways in Australia
 List of highways in Queensland
 List of highways in the Northern Territory
 List of highways in Western Australia
 Highway 1

References

External links 

 Savannah Way website

Highways in the Northern Territory
Highway 1 (Australia)
Highways in Queensland
Far North Queensland
North West Queensland
State Strategic Touring Routes in Queensland
Highways in Western Australia
Northern Australia